Zoom In is an EP by English singer-songwriter Ringo Starr, released on 19 March 2021 by Universal Music Enterprises. It was produced by Starr and co-produced by Bruce Sugar, except for "Teach Me to Tango" which was produced by Sam Hollander and co-produced by Grant Michaels.

Critical reception

Zoom In received generally mixed reviews from critics. At Metacritic, which assigns a normalised rating out of 100 to reviews from critics, the album received an average score of 53, which indicates "mixed or average reviews", based on five reviews.

Track listing

Personnel
Credits adapted from the liner notes of the physical release of Zoom In.

Ringo Starr – drums, percussion and vocals on all tracks
Charlie Bisharat – violin on "Here's to the Nights"
Jacob Braun – cello on "Here's to the Nights"
Tony Chen – guitar on "Waiting for the Tide to Turn"
Jim Cox – string arrangement and synth strings on "Here's to the Nights"
Zelma Davis – backing vocals on "Teach Me to Tango" and "Waiting for the Tide to Turn"
Charity Daw – backing vocals on "Teach Me to Tango"
Candace Devine – backing vocals on "Teach Me to Tango"
Nathan East – bass on "Here's to the Nights" and "Waiting for the Tide to Turn"
Josh Edmondson – guitar on "Teach Me to Tango"
Sean Gould – guitar on "Teach Me to Tango"
Sam Hollander – backing vocals on "Zoom In Zoom Out"
Amy Keys – backing vocals on "Zoom In Zoom Out"
James King – horns on "Teach Me to Tango"
Robby Krieger – guitar on "Zoom In Zoom Out"
Steve Lukather – guitar on "Here's to the Nights" and "Not Enough Love in the World", backing vocals on "Not Enough Love in the World"
Grant Michaels – keyboards on "Teach Me to Tango"
Kaveh Rastegar – bass on "Teach Me to Tango"
Hal Rosenfeld – percussion on "Zoom In Zoom Out"
Ed Roth – Hammond B3 organ on "Waiting for the Tide to Turn"
Jeff Silbar – bass and guitar on "Zoom In Zoom Out"
Blair Sinta – drums on "Teach Me to Tango"
Bruce Sugar – synth guitar on "Here's to the Nights", keyboards on "Waiting for the Tide to Turn"
Benmont Tench – piano on "Here's to the Nights" and "Zoom In Zoom Out", organ on "Zoom In Zoom Out"
Windy Wagner – backing vocals on "Zoom In Zoom Out"
Joseph Williams – keyboards, backing vocals and arrangement on "Not Enough Love in the World"

Guest vocals on "Here's to the Nights": Paul McCartney, Joe Walsh, Sheryl Crow, Jenny Lewis, Lenny Kravitz, Chris Stapleton, Yola, Ben Harper, Dave Grohl, Finneas O'Connell, Eric Burton and Corinne Bailey Rae

Charts

References

2021 EPs
Ringo Starr albums
Albums produced by Ringo Starr